Yellapragada Sowbhagya Krishneswara Rao is an Indian actor and writer who works in Telugu films. He played the role of a beggar in the film Chandamama Kathalu (2014), for which he received Nandi Special Jury Award. Rao acted in more than 1500 stage plays in addition to writing several of them.

Career 
He started as an artist during his school days. His first play was Vapas. Later he made a mark of himself in theater. He also lost opportunities working for films because of his dedication to theater. After watching his play Roju Chastunna Manishi (The man who is dying daily), film actor M. Prabhakar Reddy invited him to write dialogues for a film Prachanda Bharatam. Later he worked for films like Ankuram, Bhadrachalam, Sri Ramulayya, Jayam Manadera.

He is a good friend of actor Jeeva. When Jeeva was acting in Avunu Valliddaru Ista Paddaru!, he met director of that film Vamsy who promised him a role in his next picture. Later he got a role in Vamsy's Gopi Gopika Godavari.

He got a brake as a good character artist for his role as a beggar in Chandamama Kathalu. When he was playing that character in several locations, some people really thought him to be a beggar. He got good appreciation from Krishna and Vijaya Nirmala.

Filmography

As a story writer 
 Sri Ramulayya (1998)
 Jayam Manadera (2000)
Bhadrachalam (2001)

As an actor 
 Gopi Gopika Godavari (2009)
 Veera Telangana (2010)
 Saradaga Kasepu (2010)
 Chandamama Kathalu (2014)
 Vennello Hai Hai (2016)
 Vasham (2017)
 Agent Sai Srinivasa Athreya (2019)
Naandhi (2021)

References

External links

Telugu male actors
Telugu comedians
People from Guntur district
Dramatists and playwrights from Andhra Pradesh
20th-century Indian dramatists and playwrights
Living people
Year of birth missing (living people)